Sentinel is the third album by Nigel Mazlyn Jones, full title "Sentinel & The Fools of the Finest Degree". The album was recorded in February and March 1979 at Millstream Studios, Cheltenham, produced by Nigel Mazlyn Jones and engineered by John Acock and Mick Dolan. It includes contributions by regular collaborator Johnny Coppin and then-members of Coppin's band (Phil Beer, Steve Hutt and Mick Candler).

The original LP was split into two sections - "Sentinel" on side one, and "Fools of the Finest Degree" on side two.

The album was reissued on CD in 2008 by Kissing Spell Records (catalogue number KSCD957) with additional tracks.

Track listing
All tracks composed by Nigel Mazlyn Jones.
"Sentinel"
"All in the Name of Love"
"Sentinel"
"Flying"
"Roll Away"
"Fools of the Finest Degree"
"Water Road"
"All in All"
"Fools"
"The Wheel"

Additional tracks on CD reissue:
"Takes Two to Make It"
"The Hills of Celt"
"Baby This Time"
"All My Friends"
"Which Way to the Sea?"
"It Was All in the Name of Love" (instrumental)

Personnel
(taken from original LP release)
Nigel Mazlyn Jones - guitars, vocals
Mick Candler - drums, percussion
Steve Hutt - bass
Pete "Bimbo" Acock - saxophone
Dik Cadbury - guitar, vocals
Johnny Coppin - piano
Rob Lloyd - guitar
Phil Beer - violin, vocals
Chris Kerridge - bass, guitar
Dave Titley - guitar, vocals
Paul Anastasi - synthesizer

Sentinel and The Fools of the Finest Degree
1979 albums